James, Jim, Jimmy or Jamie Robinson may refer to:

Public officials
J. Kenneth Robinson (1916–1990), American Republican politician from Virginia
J. W. Robinson (James William Robinson, 1878–1964), American Democratic politician from Utah
James Robinson (Australian politician), member of the New South Wales Legislative Council
James Robinson (New Brunswick politician) (1852–1932), Canadian Conservative politician from New Brunswick
James Robinson (North Dakota judge) (1843–1933), American jurist who served on North Dakota Supreme Court
James Robinson (Ohio politician), mayor of Columbus, Ohio and president of the Columbus and Sandusky Turnpike Company
James Robinson (Wisconsin politician) (1828–1878), American politician in Wisconsin
James Fisher Robinson (1800–1882), American Democratic politician from Kentucky
James Carroll Robinson (1823–1886), American Democratic politician from Illinois
James D. Robinson (politician), Canadian mayor of Victoria, British Columbia, 1873
James E. Robinson (1868–1932), American jurist in Ohio
James L. Robinson (1838–1887), American Democratic politician from North Carolina
James M. Robinson (politician) (1861–1942), American Democratic politician from  Indiana
James S. Robinson (1827–1892), American Republican politician from Ohio
James W. Robinson (Texas and California) (1791–1857), American state official; Texas provisional governor
James Wallace Robinson (1826–1898), American Republican politician from Ohio
James Nicol Robinson, mayor of Brisbane, 1900

Military
James H. Robinson (soldier) (died 1864), Civil War private in Union Army; awarded Medal of Honor in 1864
James E. Robinson Jr. (1918–1945), Army first lieutenant; posthumous recipient of Medal of Honor in 1945
James W. Robinson Jr. (1940–1966), Army sergeant; posthumous recipient of Medal of Honor during Vietnam War
James Robinson (soldier, born 1753) (1753–1868), African American soldier in the Revolutionary War

Historians, scholars and clergymen
James Harvey Robinson (1863–1936), American historian and co-founder of New School for Social Research
James Herman Robinson (1907–1972), American clergyman and humanitarian
James A. Robinson (American political scientist) (born 1932), American academic, president of University of West Florida
James A. Robinson (economist) (born 1960), British economic and political scientist
James M. Robinson (1924–2016), American biblical scholar, author, editor and professor
James C. Robinson (health economist) (born 1953), American professor at the University of California, Berkeley

Artists, performers and producers
James E. Robinson (singer), American recording artist, vocalist in Change
James F. Robinson (filmmaker) (born 1955), American director, writer and producer
James G. Robinson (born 1935), American film producer, chairman and CEO of Morgan Creek Productions
James Robinson (writer), English writer of comic books and screenplays
James Robinson (artist), New Zealand artist and Wallace Art Awards winner
James Robinson (filk musician) (born 1948), American filk music songwriter and performer 
James Robinson (opera director), artistic director of the Opera Theatre of Saint Louis
Jim Robinson (trombonist) (1892–1976), American musician, known as Big Jim Robinson
Jimmy Robinson (actor) (1918–1967), American actor in the Mickey McGuire short film series from 1927 to 1934
Jimmy Robinson (recording engineer) (1950–2018), American recording engineer, record producer and musician
J-Ro (James Robinson, born 1969), American musical artist, co-founder of group Tha Alkaholiks
Jimmy D. Robinson, American poet, lyricist and music producer

Sports figures

Association football
James Robinson (Doncaster Rovers), English wing half for Bradford City, Doncaster Rovers, Scarborough and Newcastle, 1923–1931
James Robinson (footballer, born 1899), Irish forward; played for Manchester United and Tranmere Rovers
James Robinson (footballer, born 1982), English striker; with Crewe Alexandria, playing in Australia since 2005
Jamie Robinson (footballer) (born 1972), English central defender

Basketball
James Robinson (basketball, born 1970), American basketball player in the NBA
James Robinson (basketball, born 1994), American overseas basketball player

Gridiron football
Jimmy Robinson (American football) (born 1953), wide receiver with Giants, 49ers and Broncos; coach
James Robinson (wide receiver) (born 1982), wide receiver for Pittsburgh Power
Jamie Robinson (Canadian football) (born 1987), defensive back for the Toronto Argonauts
James Robinson (running back) (born 1998), American football running back for the New England Patriots

Rugby
Jimmy Robinson (rugby league), English rugby league footballer of the 1930s, '40s and '50s
Jamie Robinson (rugby union) (born 1980), Welsh rugby union footballer

Other sports
James Robinson (jockey) (1794–1873), British jockey
James Robinson (baseball) (1873–?), American Negro leagues baseball player
Jim Robinson (racing driver) (1946–1995), American NASCAR driver
James Robinson (runner) (born 1954), American middle-distance runner
Jim Robinson (boxer) (born 1925), American boxer
Jimmy Robinson (Australian footballer) (1881–1947), Australian rules footballer of the 1900s
Jamie Robinson (darts player) (born 1976), British darts player

Other professions
Gentleman Jim Robinson (1799–1875), African-American freeman of Virginia
James Robinson (dentist) (1813–1862), British dentist and anaesthetist
James R. Robinson (1860–1950), Scottish-American industrialist, inventor, and author of a book on mine ventilation
James "Jim" Robinson (1934–2007), English member of Bridgewater Four, convicted of killing Carl Bridgewater
James D. Robinson III (born 1935), CEO of American Express
Jim Robinson, American conservative activist; founder of online forum Free Republic
James "Rocky" Robinson, American community activist; founded Bedford-Stuyvesant Volunteer Ambulance Corps
James Robinson (biopharmacist), vice-president of the Coalition for Epidemic Preparedness Innovations
James William Robinson (sailor), Tasmanian sailor
James Kerguelen Robinson, his son, Australian prospector
James Robinson (lawyer), Irish barrister

Characters
Jim Robinson (Neighbours), soap opera character

Places
 Robinson, Washington, a ghost town named after pioneer hunter James Robinson

See also
Robinson (name)

James Robertson (disambiguation)
James Robison (disambiguation)
James Robson (disambiguation)
James William Robinson (disambiguation)